Srei Snam District is a district of Siem Reap Province, in north western Cambodia. According to the 1998 census of Cambodia, it had a population of 26,738.

Administrative divisions 
DistrictIs a district in Siem Reap Province. The district has 6 communes and 45 villages.

References 

Districts of Cambodia
Geography of Siem Reap province